This is a list of airlines currently operating in the Central African Republic:

See also
List of airlines
List of defunct airlines of Africa

Central African Republic
Airlines
 
Central African Republic
Airlines